Sri Konda Laxman Telangana State Horticultural University (SKLTSHU) is a state agricultural university located at Budwel, Hyderabad, Telangana, India, focusing on horticulture research and education. It was established in 2014 by the Government of Telangana by bifurcating the Dr. Y.S.R. Horticultural University. The university has two constituent colleges, the College of Horticulture, Mojerla in Mahbubnagar district and the College of Horticulture, Rajendranagar in Hyderabad district.

References

External links

Agricultural universities and colleges in India
Horticultural organisations based in India
Agriculture in Telangana
Universities in Hyderabad, India
Educational institutions established in 2014
2014 establishments in Telangana
State universities in Telangana